Cadlina magellanica is a species of sea slug or dorid nudibranch, a marine gastropod mollusk in the family Cadlinidae.

Distribution

Description
The maximum recorded body length is 8 mm.

Ecology
Minimum recorded depth is 16 m. Maximum recorded depth is 270 m.

References

Cadlinidae
Gastropods described in 1926